Strictly Dishonorable is a 1931 American pre-Code romantic comedy film directed by John M. Stahl and starring Paul Lukas, Sidney Fox and Lewis Stone, George Meeker, and Sidney Toler. It was written by Gladys Lehman and based on Preston Sturges' 1929 hit Broadway play of the same name. Strictly Dishonorable was Sturges' second play on Broadway, and his first to be filmed.

As a film made before the advent of the Production Code, the film-makers were able to preserve the cheerfully uninhibited sexual innuendo of the Sturges play in their movie version, which he is said to have endorsed.

Plot
Snubbish, quick-tempered Henry Greene (George Meeker) and his fiancee Isabelle Perry (Sidney Fox) stop into a New York speakeasy owned by Tomasso Antiovi (William Ricciardi) for a drink. They meet retired Judge Dempsey (Lewis Stone), an amiable man who befriends the Southern belle, much to Henry's dismay. Famous opera singer Tino Caraffa, a charming but notorious playboy, whose real name is Gus Di Ruvo (Paul Lukas), is there as well, and while Henry is gone to move his illegally parked car, Gus and Isabelle, an opera fan, get acquainted. When Henry returns, he's incensed to learn that the two of them have been dancing together. He wants Isabelle to leave with him, but she refuses and breaks their engagement, returning his ring. Henry tries to get the police to help him force Isabelle to leave by telling them that she has been "kidnapped by villains", but Judge Dempsey sets them straight, getting Henry arrested and taken away.

Gus offers to put Isabelle up for the night, assuring her that his intentions are "strictly dishonorable". The judge warns Isabelle about Gus, but she is adamant about staying because she has fallen in love. So too has Gus: Overwhelmed by Isabelle's sweetness and innocence, he spends the night in Judge Dempsey's apartment.

The next morning, Henry returns and tries to get Isabelle to come back to him. Despite appearances, she assures him that she has not lost her virtue and wants to know if he is still "pure", but he insists that it is "entirely different" for men. She reluctantly agrees to remain engaged to Henry, and he leaves to wait for her outside. Gus arrives and proposes marriage to Isabelle, but she does not believe that he loves her, and she leaves. When Gus and the judge go to get a drink, they find Isabelle there, crying. She confesses that she does love Gus, and the judge goes to tell Henry not to wait.

Cast
 Paul Lukas as Count Gus Di Ruvo
 Sidney Fox as Isabelle Perry
 Lewis Stone as Judge Dempsey
 George Meeker as Henry Greene
 William Ricciardi as Tomasso Antiovi
 Sidney Toler as Patrolman Mulligan
 Carlo Schipa as Waiter
 Samuel Bonello as Waiter
 Joe Torillo as Cook
 Joseph W. Girard as Officer
 Aldo Franchetti as Arguing Customer

Cast notes:
 "Dempsey" was the maiden name of Preston Sturges' mother.
 William Ricciardi is the only actor who also appeared in the Broadway production of Strictly Dishonorable.
 Natalie Moorhead played the role of Lilli, one of Gus's lovers, but her scenes were deleted.
 Sidney Toler achieved fame playing Charlie Chan.

Production
Universal paid Preston Sturges the record sum of $125,000 for the rights to Strictly Dishonorable, equal only to RKO's purchase of the rights to Cimarron.

The film was in production from June 30 to August 15, 1931, and was released on December 26 of that year. The Los Angeles premiere took place at the Carthay Circle Theatre.

Other versions
Sturges' play was filmed again in 1951, and released by MGM under the same title Strictly Dishonorable. It was written, produced and directed by Melvin Frank and Norman Panama and starred Ezio Pinza and Janet Leigh. Much of the sexual innuendo of the original was scrubbed from the remake, which was a musical.

References

External links 
 
 
 

1931 films
American black-and-white films
American films based on plays
Films directed by John M. Stahl
1931 romantic comedy films
Universal Pictures films
Films set in New York City
Films based on works by Preston Sturges
American romantic comedy films
1930s English-language films
1930s American films